The Ground-Based Radar Prototype (GBR-P) is an X-band mechanically slewed phased array radar system. It functions primarily as a fire control radar for ballistic missile defence. The radar is used for surveillance (autonomously or by cue from other sensors), and is designed to acquire, track, discriminate targets and provide kill assessment. The system is currently located at the Ronald Reagan Ballistic Missile Defense Test Site, Kwajalein Atoll, Marshall Islands.

See also
 Sea-Based X-Band Radar
 Upgraded Early Warning Radars

References

Military radars
Radar networks
Missile defense
United States Space Surveillance Network